Ramon Rivero may refer to:

Ramón Rivero (1909–1956) also known as Diplo, Puerto Rican comedian, actor, composer and a pioneer in Puerto Rico's radio, television and cinema industries
Ramon Rivero (animator), New Zealand digital puppeteer and computer animator
José Ramón Rivero, Venezuelan politician